Hammarskjold High School is a public high school located in Thunder Bay, Ontario, Canada, with an enrollment of roughly 850 students. It is named after Swedish diplomat Dag Hammarskjöld. The principal of Hammarskjold High School is Derek DiBlasio and the vice-principal is Donna Flasza.

History 

Hammarskjold High School was constructed in 1962 in response to rapidly increasing enrollment at the former City of Port Arthur's other public high schools (Port Arthur Collegiate Institute, Hillcrest High School, and Lakeview High School). The school was given its name through a student referendum.

Hammarskjold accepted students in fall 1962 with only the two story classroom wing completed.  The first student assembly at Christmas had male students sitting on the gym floor while the girls sat on the steel chairs, as the bleachers were not completed yet.  The official opening was on May 22, 1963.

Hammarskjold High School has undergone numerous renovations and expansions throughout its history. The most recent expansion, in the early 1990s, saw the addition of a library and music room in the school's former technology wing. Several technology classrooms have been converted to academic classrooms along with the school's increasing emphasis on academics over vocations.

In terms of athletics they have one of the city's most successful football programs, recently winning the 2008 SSSAA Football Championship.

Location

Hammarskjold High School's campus is located next to St. Pius X School of the Thunder Bay Catholic District School Board.

Facilities include:
Gymnasium
Computer Labs
Full-sized kitchens
Lecture Theatre
Library
Garden
Theatre/Dramatic Arts Room
2 Art Rooms
2 Music Rooms
Football field
4 half-sized tennis courts
Multipurpose field

Academic programs

Hammarskjold offers a curriculum that includes Advanced Placement, French immersion, vocational, and college preparation courses.

French Immersion Program
Hammarskjold High School is the only secondary school within the Lakehead District School Board that offers the French immersion program. The four year program includes classes in geography, physical education, civics and careers, Canadian history, food and nutrition, cooperative education, food and culture, and anthropology. Hammarskjold High School is one of the Diplôme d'études en langue française (DELF) accredited evaluation centres in the city where grade 12 French immersion, or grade 12 core French students can take the internationally-recognized language examination. Often, core French students from Westgate Collegiate & Vocational Institute and Superior Collegiate and Vocational Institute travel to Hammarskjold to write the DELF examination each school year.

Fine Arts

Hammarskjold High School Music Department
The Hammarskjold High School Music Department consists of a band class, strings ensemble, a jazz band, a full-sized orchestra, guitar, and vocal choir. The HHS music department travels to different cities each year to compete and perform against other high schools, often with great amounts of success. In the 2018-2019 school year the HHS music department traveled to Chicago, IL with their band class, their strings ensemble, and their vocal choir. During second semester, the HHS music department organizes a gala night with a different theme to be performed in the Hammarskjold Gymnasium each school year. The gala night consists of performances from the entire department, as well as dancing, singing and draws with prizes to be won. The theme for the 2018-2019 school year gala was "Flashback to the 80's" where performers dressed in their best 80's themed outfits, and the entire department performed pieces of music from the 80's.

Hammarskjold High School Drama Department
Hammarskjold High School is also known for their ever-expanding drama program, recently producing a production of Disney's Frozen Jr. to local critical acclaim The HHS drama department produces two productions each school year, usually a musical first semester, and a play second semester. Hammarskjold High School has produced popular shows in the past such as High School Musical, Elf, Honk!, Peter Pan and Roald Dahl's Willy Wonka.  As of right now, the HHS drama department is in rehearsals for the Broadway smash hit The Wedding Singer, and is scheduled to perform the show in June 2020 in the Hammarskjold Gymnasium.

Hammarskjold High School Visual Arts Department
The Visual Arts department covers painting, performance art, sculpture, drawing, media studies, art appreciation, theory and history. The Visual Arts department often works in conjunction with the Thunder Bay Art Gallery each school year.

The Art facilities include two full-sized studios with high ceilings, full-sized tables for art design and sculpting, and room designated for art display.

Clubs and Extracurricular Activities

Clubs
Hammarskjold High School is home to many clubs, some of the clubs offered at HHS include:

Hammbassadors
Math Club
Chess Club
Hammarskjold Indigenous Committee 
Hammarskjold Multicultural Club
Hammarskjold Yearbook
Glee Choir
Hammarskjold Prom Committee
Travel Club
GSA
Hammarskjold Music Committee 
Natural Helpers

Sports
Hammarskjold High School is home to many sports teams, some of the sports offered at HHS include:

Football - Jr./Sr. 
Basketball
Volleyball
Track & Field
Curling
Wrestling 
Mountain Biking
Badminton
Hockey 
Soccer
Ski
Golf
Competitive Cheerleading
Tennis
Cross-Country Running

Feeder Schools

The following elementary schools feed into Hammarskjold High School:

Agnew H. Johnston Public School (FI)
Algonquin Avenue Public School
C.D. Howe Public School
Claude E. Garton Public School (FI)
École Gron Morgan Public School
Woodcrest Public School

See also
List of high schools in Ontario
Education in Thunder Bay, Ontario

References

External links 
 

High schools in Thunder Bay
Educational institutions established in 1962
1962 establishments in Ontario